Cinesite Studios (also known as Cinesite VFX or simply Cinesite) is an independent, multinational business which provides services to the media and entertainment industries.  Its head office in London opened for business in 1994, initially offering services in visual effects for film and television, subsequently expanding to include feature animation.

Divisions of Cinesite and its partner companies Image Engine  TRIXTER, L'Atelier Animation, Squeeze and Assemblage Entertainment operate in London, Berlin, Munich, Skopje, Belgrade, Montreal, Quebec City, Vancouver and Mumbai with more than 2,500 employees.

History

Foundation 

Cinesite opened its doors in Los Angeles in 1991 to help with the digital restoration of Snow White and the Seven Dwarfs. The restoration was released in 1993, and Cinesite opened a division in London in 1994. There, it originally operated as a service bureau for Kodak's Cineon digital film system. Both locations subsequently evolved to become full service visual effects facilities. In 2003, Kodak merged the Cinesite Hollywood office into LaserPacific.

In May 2012, Kodak sold Cinesite to a UK-based private investor. Current ownership is a combination of its existing management team supported by private investment.

International growth 
After Cinesite became independent from Kodak in 2012, it began a sustained period of international growth.

In January 2014, with the support of Investissement Québec, Cinesite announced its opening of 27,000 sq ft studios in Montréal and a feature animation division at that location. Its initial employment target was reached 18 months early, in August 2015.

In July 2015, Cinesite announced its acquisition of Vancouver-based visual effects facility Image Engine, which has won Emmy awards for its visual effects on The Book of Boba Fett and Game of Thrones and also received an Academy Award nomination for District 9 in 2010.

In March 2017, it acquired Vancouver-based animation studio Nitrogen Studios and in August 2018 the German VFX studio TRIXTER.

In June 2018, Cinesite was placed in the annual Sunday Times HSBC International Track 200 league table, which ranks the UK's highest performing private firms by international growth.

In 2022 the company announced a series of further acquisitions, beginning with L'Atelier Animation in July, Squeeze Studios in early August, Balkan-based visual effects studio FX3X later that month and in November, Assemblage Entertainment in Mumbai.

Visual effects 
The Cinesite group of visual effects companies includes its own brand services, along with partner companies Image Engine, TRIXTER and FX3X.

Notable feature film productions Cinesite has created visual effects for include Roald Dahl's Matilda The Musical (2022), Black Panther: Wakanda Forever (2022), No Time to Die (2021) and Avengers: Endgame (2019). Cinesite has completed work on all eight films in the Harry Potter franchise in addition to Fantastic Beasts and Where to Find Them and nine films in the James Bond franchise.

Cinesite's episodic work includes, Moon Knight, The Wheel of Time and Emmy nominated The Man Who Fell to Earth. It won a BAFTA craft award in 2022 for the second season of The Witcher as well as Emmy awards for Generation Kill (2008) and Rome (2006). Emmy nominations include American Gods: Season 1 and Band of Brothers (2002).

Cinesite won a Visual Effects Society award in 2021 for its work on Universal Studios' stage-based stunt show The Bourne Stuntacular.  The show also won an award from the TEA (Themed Entertainment Association) which stated, "The high level of technical achievement and the creative application in creating a spectacular, immersive experience makes The Bourne Stuntacular a worthy recipient of this honor."

Feature animation 

On 8 February 2016, Cinesite announced the launch of a dedicated feature animation division at its Montréal Studios. Since then, it has worked with production partners to complete Charming (2018), Gnome Alone (2018), Trouble (2019), and Fearless (2020) for 3QU Media, The Star (2017) for Sony Pictures Animation, and Extinct (2021) for Huayi Brothers.

In addition to providing production services for other studios, Cinesite produces its own animated features through Aniventure. Cinesite first collaborated with River Productions to produce Riverdance: The Animated Adventure (2021); an animated version of the Irish stage show of the same name, then took over production on the long-gestating feature Paws of Fury: The Legend of Hank (2022). They recently completed Hitpig (2023); a loose adaptation of the Berkeley Breathed book Pete & Pickles, and are next set to produce the long in-development adaptation of Animal Farm directed by Andy Serkis.

Vancouver-based animation company Nitrogen Studios was rebranded under Cinesite soon after its acquisition by the group in March 2017.  Since then, it has worked for MGM on The Addams Family (2019) and its sequel. In 2022, Cinesite acquired the Montreal-based L'Atelier Animation, and later in the year, purchased majority stakes in Squeeze Studio and Assemblage Entertainment.

Credits

VFX 1996-2019

TV series

Animation credits

See also 
 Digital Domain
 DNEG
 Framestore
 Industrial Light & Magic
 Moving Picture Company
 Rhythm and Hues Studios
 Sony Pictures Imageworks
 Weta Digital
 Image Engine

References

External links 
 Cinesite's website
 The UK Screen Association
 Cinesite on the IMDB

British animation studios
Television and film post-production companies
Visual effects companies
Mass media companies based in London
Entertainment companies established in 1991
1991 establishments in California
Companies based in the City of Westminster
2012 mergers and acquisitions
Private equity portfolio companies
Privately held companies based in London